Giamcarlos José Betancourt García (born 21 July 2000) is a Venezuelan footballer who plays as a midfielder for Venezuelan Primera División side Deportivo Anzoátegui.

Club career
Betancourt made his senior professional debut in a 1–0 win over Estudiantes de Mérida, playing 61 minutes before being replaced by Aitor López.

Career statistics

Club

Notes

References

2000 births
Living people
Venezuelan footballers
Association football midfielders
Deportivo La Guaira players
Venezuelan Primera División players
21st-century Venezuelan people